

Samuel Lancaster Gerry (1813–1891) was an artist in 19th-century Boston, Massachusetts. He painted portraits and also landscapes of the White Mountains and other locales in New England. He was affiliated with the New England Art Union, and the Boston Artists' Association. In 1857 he co-founded the Boston Art Club.

Born in Boston, Gerry was self-taught as an artist. He showed works in many public settings, such as the 1841 exhibit of the Massachusetts Charitable Mechanic Association; and an 1879 exhibit of contemporary art at the Museum of Fine Arts, Boston. He attended the 1860 convention of the National Art Association in Washington, DC. Students of Gerry included H. Frances Osborne, Samuel Green Wheeler Benjamin, Fannie Elliot Gifford, Charles Wesley Sanderson, and J. Frank Currier. With the exception of three years abroad, his professional life was passed chiefly in Boston.

References

Further reading
 Dwight's Journal of Music, March 19, 1853; p. 189.
 Samuel L. Gerry. Old Masters of Boston. New England Magazine, v.3, no.6, Feb. 1891.
 The Critic. May 2, 1891; p. 241.
 Catherine H. Campbell. New Hampshire Scenery: A Dictionary of Nineteenth-Century Artists of New Hampshire Mountain Landscapes. Canaan, NH: New Hampshire Historical Society, 1985.
 Rolf H. Kristiansen and John J. Leahy. Rediscovering Some New England Artists 1875–1900. Dedham, MA: Gardner-O'Brien Associates, 1987.

External links

 WorldCat. Gerry, S. L. (Samuel Lancaster) 1813-1891
 New Hampshire Historical Society. Consuming views: art and tourism in the White Mountains, 1850–1900.
 Smithsonian. Archives of American Art. Samuel Lancaster Gerry, Malden, Ma. letter to unidentified recipient, 1853 March 13.
 Biography of Samuel Lancaster Gerry on WhiteMountainArt.com
 White Mountain paintings by Samuel Lancaster Gerry

19th-century American painters
American male painters
1813 births
1891 deaths
Artists from Boston
19th century in Boston
19th-century American male artists